Johann Lahr (21 January 1913 – 24 February 1942) was a Czechoslovak ski jumper. He competed in the individual event at the 1936 Winter Olympics. On 2 March 1941, he set personal best at 111 m (364 ft) in Planica, and not a world record as it was misconception for many years. Lahr, an ethnic German, served in Wehrmacht, and was killed in action on the Eastern Front during World War II.

References

External links
 

1913 births
1942 deaths
People from Trutnov District
People from the Kingdom of Bohemia
Sudeten German people
Czech male ski jumpers
Czech male Nordic combined skiers
Olympic ski jumpers of Czechoslovakia
Olympic Nordic combined skiers of Czechoslovakia
Ski jumpers at the 1936 Winter Olympics
Nordic combined skiers at the 1936 Winter Olympics
German military personnel killed in World War II
Sportspeople from the Hradec Králové Region